Guillermo Vilas was the defending champion and won in the final 6–3, 0–6, 7–5, 6–2 against Manuel Orantes.

Draw

 NB: All rounds up to but not including the semifinals were the best of 3 sets. The semifinals and final were the best of 5 sets.

Final

Section 1

Section 2

External links
 1974 Buenos Aires Grand Prix Singles draw

Singles
1974 in Argentine tennis